George Frederick Cox (born 14 January 1998) is an English professional footballer who plays as a left back for Fortuna Sittard.

Career

Brighton & Hove Albion
Cox began his career with Brighton & Hove Albion, undergoing heart surgery which nearly ended his career.

Northampton Town (loan)
He moved on loan to Northampton Town on 7 January 2019 on a 6-month deal. Cox made his Northampton debut in a League Two match against Carlisle where Northampton won 3–0 on 12 January 2019.

Fortuna Sittard (loan)
On 2 September 2019, Cox signed with Dutch club Fortuna Sittard on a season-long loan with the option of a permanent move.

Fortuna Sittard
On 6 July 2020, it was announced that Cox had signed permanently with Fortuna Sittard on a three-year deal, for a fee of €50,000.

Career statistics

References

1998 births
Living people
English footballers
Brighton & Hove Albion F.C. players
Northampton Town F.C. players
Fortuna Sittard players
English Football League players
Association football fullbacks
English expatriate footballers
English expatriates in the Netherlands
Expatriate footballers in the Netherlands
Eredivisie players